Ingrid Piltingsrud (born 6 June 1942) is a Norwegian politician for the Conservative Party.

She served as a deputy representative to the Norwegian Parliament from Oppland during the term 1981–1985. In total she met during 94 days of parliamentary session.

References

1942 births
Living people
Deputy members of the Storting
Conservative Party (Norway) politicians
Oppland politicians
Place of birth missing (living people)
20th-century Norwegian women politicians
20th-century Norwegian politicians
Women members of the Storting